Robert M. Weitman (1905–1989) was an American film, TV and theatre producer and studio executive. For a number of years he was a leading executive at Metro-Goldwyn-Mayer, being head of production during a successful period in the 1960s under president Robert O'Brien. The two men oversaw the production of the last consistent run of classic films at the studio.

Weitman ran theatres for Paramount in the 1930s and 40s, often booking big bands, In 1953 he went to work for ABC then moved to CBD in 1956. He joined MGM in 1960 and worked in TV production, enjoying success with the Dr Kildare series. He was appointed head of film production in January 1962. He oversaw the completion and release of How the West Was Won and Mutiny on the Bounty and the first film of his regime was Unsinkable Molly Brown. Among the films initiated under his management were Young Cassidy, 36 Hours, The Dirty Dozen and Dr Zhivago. MGM also expanded its TV production division. Under Weitman and O'Brien, MGM, which made a $30 million loss in 1963, turned around and made a profit of $17 million the following year. In 1966 they reported a $10 million profit.

MGM became the subject of a corporate take over attempt by Philip Levin in 1967. Weitman resigned in 1967 and was replaced by Clark Ramsay. Weitman became head of production at Columbia, replacing Mike Frankovich. Although he had a five-year contract Weitman left this post in late 1969, Columbia saying the new filmmaking environment meant his job would no longer exist. Weitman then became an independent producer with an exclusive contract to Columbia, starting with The Anderson Tapes.

Filmography
The Anderson Tapes (1971) – producer
Shamus (1973) – producer
A Matter of Wife... and Death (1975) (TV movie) – producer

References

External links

American film producers
1905 births
1989 deaths
American film studio executives
Metro-Goldwyn-Mayer executives
20th-century American businesspeople